Vice Admiral Andrew Laurence Collier  (June 3, 1924 – January 3, 1987) was a Canadian Forces officer who served as Commander Maritime Command from 14 June 1977 to 30 June 1979.

Early years
Collier was born in Kamloops and raised in Salmon Arm, where his family was prominent in the grocery business.

Naval career
Collier joined the Royal Canadian Navy in 1942 and completed his training in 1945. He became Commanding Officer of the destroyer  in 1960, Captain Sea Training on the staff of the Flag Officer Atlantic Coast in 1962 and Director Naval Plans at the National Defence Headquarters in 1964. He went on to be Director International Plans in 1965, Commander Seventh Canadian Escort Squadron in 1966 and Deputy Chief of Staff Maritime Training in 1967. After that he became Deputy Chief of Staff (Combat Readiness) in 1970, Commander Canadian Flotilla (Atlantic) in 1972 and Senior Liaison Officer (Navy) on the Defence Liaison Staff in Washington, D.C. in 1973. His last appointments were as Chief of Maritime Operations in 1974, Commander Maritime Forces Pacific in 1975 and Commander Maritime Command in 1977, in which role he argued for more ships, before retiring in 1979.

Awards and decorations
Collier's personal awards and decorations include the following:

130pxx36px

115px118px

115px126px

Later career
He was appointed Commissioner of the Canadian Coast Guard in 1980 and served as president of the British Columbia Ferry Corporation 1984–1987. He died in Victoria.

References

1924 births
1987 deaths
Canadian admirals
People from Kamloops
Royal Canadian Navy officers
Commanders of the Order of Military Merit (Canada)
Commanders of the Royal Canadian Navy
Canadian expatriates in the United States
Canadian military personnel from British Columbia
Canadian recipients of the Distinguished Service Cross (United Kingdom)